George Gordon McCrae (29 May 1833 – 15 August 1927) was an Australian poet.

Early life
McCrae was born in Leith, Scotland; his father was Andrew Murison McCrae, a writer; his mother was Georgiana McCrae, a painter. George attended a preparatory school in London, and later received lessons from his mother. Georgiana and her four sons emigrated to Melbourne in 1841 following her husband who emigrated in 1839.

Career
After a few years as a surveyor, McCrae joined the Victorian Government service, eventually becoming Deputy Registrar-General, and also a prominent figure in literary circles. Most of his leisure time was spent in writing. His first published work was Two Old Men's Tales of Love and War (London, 1865).

His son Hugh McCrae, also a poet, produced a volume of memoirs (My Father and My Father's Friends) about George and his association with such literary figures as Henry Kendall, Adam Lindsay Gordon, Richard Henry Horne and Marcus Clarke.

George McCrae wrote novels, stories, poetry, and travel sketches, and illustrated books. After his retirement, unpublished manuscripts entitled 'Reminiscences—Experiences not Exploits' contain detailed descriptions of events from his youth and present a record of the early European part of Melbourne country-side.

Late life
McCrae died 15 August 1927 at Hawthorn in Melbourne, survived by four of his six children, including Dorothy Frances Perry, also an author.

Bibliography
The Story of Balladeadro (1867)
Mamba, the Bright-Eyed: an Aboriginal Reminiscence (1867)
The Man in the Iron Mask (1873)
The Fleet and Convoy (1915)
John Rous (1918)

References
Norman Cowper, 'McCrae, George Gordon (1833 - 1927)', Australian Dictionary of Biography, Volume 5, MUP, 1974, pp 136–137.

Additional resources listed by the Australian Dictionary of Biography:
R. G. Howarth, Literary Particles (Sydney, 1946)
H. E. Chaplin, A McCrae Miscellany (Sydney, 1967)
W. Dixson, 'Notes on Australian artists', Journal of the Royal Australian Historical Society, 9 (1923)
Spinner, July 1925
The Argus (Melbourne), 11 July 1890, 16 August 1927
family papers (privately held). Extracts of McCrae's papers were reprinted, with the permission of son Hugh, in Southerly magazine in 1946.

External links
George Gordon McCrae (contains some of his poems)

1833 births
1927 deaths
19th-century Australian novelists
20th-century Australian novelists
Australian male novelists
Scottish emigrants to colonial Australia
Australian male short story writers
People from Leith
Poets from Melbourne
Australian male poets
19th-century Australian short story writers
19th-century male writers
20th-century Australian short story writers
20th-century Australian male writers
19th-century Australian public servants
Australian surveyors
Australian people of English descent